Harlequinade is a 1961 Australian TV play based on the Terence Rattigan play Harlequinade. It was directed by Bill Bain.

It was the first adaptation of Terence Rattigan on Australian television.

Plot
A middle aged couple, Arthur and Edna are appearing in a stage production of Romeo and Juliet in a small town. They meet a woman who claims to be Arthur's daughter from his first marriage.

They realise they are too young to play star crossed lovers.

Cast
John Alden as Arthur Gosport
Neva Carr Glyn as Edna Selby
Owen Weingott as Fred Ingram
Don Pascoe as Fred Wakefield
Enid Lorimer as Dame Maud
Cherrie Butlin as Joyce
Lou Vernon
Marcia Hathaway
Martin Redpath
Peter Stewart
Frank Taylor
Alan Tobin
Hilary Linstead

Production
It starred Cherrie Butlin who was the daughter of Billy Butlin; she had lived in Australia for three years. The set was designed by Philip Hickie.

Reception
The Sydney Morning Herald called it "skittish and affectionate".

References

1961 television plays
Australian television plays